Just Like Real Life is the third and final studio album by the Christian rock band Prodigal, released in 1985.

The band created promotional music videos for "Future Now"  and "Jump Cut," which were featured on Trinity Broadcasting Network's music video show Real Videos at the time of the album's release.

Track listing

Band members
Loyd Boldman: Keyboards, vocals
Dave Workman: Drums, vocals
Rick Fields: Guitars, vocals
Mike Wilson: Bass guitar

Other personnel
Wes Boatman: Synthesizer programming

Production
Executive producer: Jon Phelps
Producer and engineer: Gary Platt
Assistant engineer: Steve Moller
Mastering: Mike Fuller

References 

1985 albums
Prodigal (band) albums